Field pea may refer to:

 Field pea (Pisum), a type of common pea (Pisum sativum), sometimes called dry field pea used worldwide for human or animal consumption
 Cowpea (Vigna unguiculata), used for culinary purposes and forage in Africa and the Americas

See also
 Pea (disambiguation)